"Nie Yinniang" (Chinese: 聶隱娘, Niè Yǐnniáng) is a short story written in Classical Chinese by Pei Xing, a Chinese writer who lived during the Tang dynasty. The story is set in 9th century China and tells the story of Nie Yinniang who was trained in martial arts from a young age. She is the daughter of Nie Feng, a general under Tian Ji'an, the ruler of the de facto independent fanzhen of Weibo. The story was published in the collection Pei Xing Chuanqi (Chinese: 裴鉶传奇).

Plot 

At the age of 12, Nie Yinniang was placed under a spell, and taught the arts of fencing and stealthy kungfu, enabling her to assassinate targets undetected. After five years of training, Nie is sent home to her father, but because of Yinniang's exceptional kungfu skills, her father is petrified. Fearful of his daughter, he was also reluctant to ask Nie why she regularly disappears after dusk without explanation.

With better insight into the human condition, Nie Yinniang chooses a man who makes his living by polishing mirrors as her husband. After the death of her father, the general Tian Ji'an sees Nie's advanced skills and hires her as an assistant.

During the reign of Tang Xian Zong, Tian Ji'an developed an adversarial relationship with Liu Changyi, another famous general at that time. This adversary seeks out the advice of a spiritual leader with renowned prophetic skill. Nie turns on Ji'an and works for Liu. Furious, he sends Jingjinger to slay both Nie Yinniang and Liu Changyi – but he fails and Nie kills him instead. Tian Ji'an escalates the battle, sending Kongkonger to assassinate Liu, but Nie foils the assassination attempt. Finally, Liu Changyi is safe and treats Nie better than ever.

A few years later, after Liu moves to the capital to work for the emperor, Nie bids him farewell, She later remembers him at his funeral, where she attends his coffin to show respect and to mourn.

Movie adaptation 
The Assassin is a 2015 martial arts film directed by Taiwanese director Hou Hsiao-hsien. At Cannes, Hou won the award for Best Director for this film. It was released in China on 27 August 2015. It was selected as the Taiwanese entry for the Best Foreign Language Film at the 88th Academy Awards.

See also 
 Chinese literature
 chuanqi
 Wuxia

References 

Short stories set in the Tang dynasty
Short stories by Pei Xing
Short stories adapted into films
Fiction about assassinations
Fiction set in the 8th century
Fiction set in the 9th century
Short stories set in Hebei
Stories within Taiping Guangji
Short stories set in Henan
Wuxia short stories
Short stories set in Sichuan